Attorney General Phillips may refer to:

Gregory A. Phillips (born 1960), Attorney General of Wyoming 
Karl Hudson-Phillips (1933–2014), Attorney General of Trinidad and Tobago
Stephen Henry Phillips (1823–1897), Attorney General of Massachusetts and Attorney General of the Kingdom of Hawaii

See also
General Phillips (disambiguation)
Mark Filip (born 1966), Acting Attorney General of the United States